Bank Day (Bānk-e Dey) is a non-state owned bank, established in 2010, which conducts its operations within the guidelines and instructions of the Central Bank of the Islamic Republic of Iran (CBI).

Bank Day shares have been floated on the Over-the-Counter market and measures are being taken in order to become listed in the Tehran Stock Exchange.

Despite its relatively short life, Bank Day is also successfully penetrating the increasingly competitive Iranian financial market. Market acquisition may be reflected in the increasing number of Day Bank’s branches, over the previous four years.

International Banking
Bank Day has joined SWIFT transaction system, which facilitates worldwide bank transfers.

Sponsorship

Bank Day was a 2016 sponsor of Iran National Volleyball Teams & Federation.

See also

Banking in Iran

References

External links
 

Companies listed on the Tehran Stock Exchange
Banks of Iran
Banks established in 2010
Iranian companies established in 2010